Kouadio Daniel Nguessan Pascal (born April 7, 1986) is an Ivorian footballer. He currently plays for 
Esan United in the Thai Premier League.

References

Ivorian footballers
Association football midfielders
1986 births
Living people
Ivorian expatriate footballers
Expatriate footballers in Thailand
Ivorian expatriate sportspeople in Thailand
Kouadio Pascal
Kouadio Pascal
Kouadio Pascal
Kouadio Pascal
People from Bouaké